The A20 is a major road in south-east England, carrying traffic from London to Dover in Kent. Parts of the route date back to turnpikes established in the early part of the 18th century. The line of the road throughout Kent runs closely in parallel with the M20 motorway.

Route

From London to the M25
Traffic leaving London at first takes the A2 road; at New Cross in the London Borough of Lewisham the A20 begins and heads in a south-easterly direction, becoming in turn Lewisham Way and  Loampit Vale. The latter road forms a large junction, where the A21 separates for Bromley. The road now runs through Lee High Road into Eltham Road, The junction with the A210 has an unusually long 41 metre yellow box junction. and continues as the Sidcup Bypass, crossing the A222 at Frognal Corner and the A224 at Crittall's Corner.  Entering Kent, it widens from two lanes to three lanes near Swanley and continues onto the M20 motorway.

Junctions

The main junctions on the London to M25 section are:
New Cross one-way system (the road starts here and branches from the A2)
Lewisham Gateway (with the A21, A2210 and A2211)
Sutcliffe Park (with the A210 to Eltham) – the road becomes a dual carriageway east of this junction
Clifton's Roundabout (with the A205 South Circular)
Fiveways, New Eltham (with the B263); this is the last at-grade junction heading out of London
Frognal Corner (with the A222)
Crittall's Corner (with the A223 and A224)
Swanley Interchange (M25 Junction 3 / M20 Junction 1)

The M25 to Dover
The A20 then passes the racing circuit at Brands Hatch before descending steeply from the North Downs escarpment past Wrotham then West Malling and on to the county town of Maidstone. The route beyond Maidstone travels East, through the villages of Bearsted, Harrietsham, Lenham and Charing to Ashford.

The A292 takes over the former A20 through Ashford itself, then the road emerges as it heads through Willesborough and Sellindge in the direction of Hythe. It takes a sharp turn left at Newingreen (the site of the UK's first motel) before entering Folkestone via Cheriton, passing the vehicular entrance to the Channel Tunnel, forming part of the town's original bypass as the trunk road from the M20. The route then follows the coastline, tunnelling through the hills and descending to the docks in Dover, where it meets the A2 again coming down from Canterbury.

History

Part of the route now followed by the modern road, particularly the western section, was opened as various turnpikes in the 18th century in an effort to improve coaching links between London and the Kent towns.

In the early days of the Great Britain road numbering scheme the A20 ran through Eltham.  along Eltham Road the Sidcup Arterial Road begins, opened in 1923, which carries traffic south of the two towns instead, leaving the A210 and A211 roads following the original route.  The nearby town of Swanley was bypassed in 1968, and the short link between the two bypasses was constructed in 1988 (to the south of the Ruxley Corner roundabout).

A section of the A20 in Ashford formed part of the Ashford By-Pass, a dual carriageway opened in 1957, which used to run from what is now the roundabout with Simone Weil Avenue to the Willesborough roundabout. Simone Weil Avenue is the original A20 bypass, but has been diverted to curtail at Canterbury Road. The eastern end of the old by-pass is now the M20.

The section between Maidstone and Ashford was the only link between the two separate sections of the M20 for 10 years during the 1980s, until the  missing link of the motorway was completed in May 1991.

North of Folkestone the M20 becomes a dual carriageway and enters the Roundhill Tunnel before crossing over and dropping down into Dover. This part of the A20 was completed in 1993 as a project included in the Parliamentary Bill for the Channel Tunnel. During 2011, structural failures in and around the Roundhill Tunnel have caused the A20 to be closed in this area numerous times.

References

External links

SABRE: A20

Transport in the Borough of Ashford
Transport in the London Borough of Bexley
Streets in the London Borough of Bromley
Streets in the London Borough of Lewisham
Roads in Kent
Roads in London